Fastline was created by six railwaymen who undertook a successful management buyout (MBO) of Eastern Track Renewals from British Rail in 1996.  In that year they bought Northern Track Renewals from British Rail, and undertook all the studies and examinations that resulted in their acquiring a Harsco Track Renewals Train, the first continuous-process track relaying system in the country.  They also examined the possibility of acquiring their own diesel locomotives because of dissatisfaction with the service provided by others for engineering trains.  The company was acquired by Jarvis, who later resurrected the Fastline name to create a railway freight operator. It operated a fleet of Class 56 and Class 66 locomotives.  The class 56s cost £700,000 each to refurbish. A fourth and a fifth Class 56 (56311 & 56312) were hired in from Hanson Traction Ltd. Fastline's base was at Doncaster, Yorkshire. It ceased trading when Jarvis plc entered administration and subsequently ceased trading in late March 2010. The company is in administration with N.G. Edwards, N.B. Kahn, P.S. Bowers and I. Brown of Deloitte LLP.

Operations

Container traffic
The company's main operation at first was 4O90, a container train to Thamesport on the Isle of Grain, which operated in the afternoon/evening, and returned in the early hours of the next morning, usually operating Class 56 locomotives.  Since the end of Fastline's container traffic flows from Doncaster to the Isle of Grain, the class 56s were intended to be used on Fastline's coal flows.

Coal flows
They also ran several coal flows including from Hatfield to Ratcliffe-on-Soar Power Station, using Class 66s and a new build of coal hoppers. Coal flows run by Fastline included:
 Coal from Daw Mill to Ratcliffe-on-Soar Power Station
 Coal from Hatfield Colliery to Ratcliffe-on-Soar Power Station
 Coal from Daw Mill to Cottam Power Station
 Coal from Immingham to Ironbridge Power Station

Fleet details
Each machine (except number 66434) were for sale by administrators. 66301-305 Taken on by Direct Rail Services, with on-hire 66434 now returned to the Direct Rail Services fleet and now branded in Malcolm Rail livery.

Locomotive disposals
Numbers 56301 and 56302 have been preserved and were moved to Barrow Hill Engine Shed in April 2011.

References

Rail freight companies in the United Kingdom